Morphosphaera is a genus of skeletonizing leaf beetles in the family Chrysomelidae. There are about 11 described species in Morphosphaera. They are found in Indomalaya and eastern Asia.

Species
These 11 species belong to the genus Morphosphaera:

 Morphosphaera albipennis Allard, 1889
 Morphosphaera bimaculata Chujo, 1938
 Morphosphaera caerulea (Schönfeldt, 1890)
 Morphosphaera chrysomeloides (Bates, 1866)
 Morphosphaera collaris Laboissière, 1930
 Morphosphaera coomani Laboissière, 1930
 Morphosphaera japonica (Hornstedt, 1788)
 Morphosphaera maculicollis Baly, 1861
 Morphosphaera montivaga Maulik, 1936
 Morphosphaera sumatrana Jacoby, 1886
 Morphosphaera takizawai Lee & Bezdĕk, 2016

References

External links

 

Galerucinae
Chrysomelidae genera
Taxa named by Joseph Sugar Baly